Desyatukha is a rural locality (a settlement) and the administrative center of Desyatukhovsky Rural Settlement, Starodubsky District, Bryansk Oblast, Russia. The population was 1,263 as of 2010. There are 16 streets.

Geography 
Desyatukha is located 6 km east of Starodub (the district's administrative centre) by road. Vodotishche and Levenka is the nearest rural locality.

References 

Rural localities in Starodubsky District